Vikings is a 2012 BBC television documentary series written and presented by Neil Oliver charting the rise of the Vikings from prehistoric times to the empire of Canute.

Episodes

Media
A 304-page book authored by Oliver and titled Vikings: A History was published by W&N on 4 October 2012. In addition, a 177-minute PAL region 2 DVD version of the series was released by the BBC on 12 November 2012

See also
 Vikings (2013 TV series)

References

External links

2012 British television series debuts
2012 British television series endings
Television series set in the Viking Age
BBC television documentaries about medieval history
BBC television documentaries about prehistoric and ancient history